Aalten is a railway station located in Aalten, Netherlands. The station is on the Winterswijk–Zevenaar railway and the station opened on 15 July 1885. The building began construction in 1884 and was finished in 1885. It was rebuilt in 1919 and has since remained unaltered. It was briefly closed from 15-8-1945 until 20-10-1945. The service is now operated by Arriva.

Train services

Bus services

References

External links
NS website 
Dutch Public Transport journey planner 
Arriva Gelderland website 
Arriva Achterhoek Network Map 

Railway stations in Gelderland
Railway stations opened in 1885
Aalten
1885 establishments in the Netherlands
Railway stations in the Netherlands opened in the 19th century